Al-Qadeer Higher Secondary School is one of the institutions run by a Non-Government Organisation (NGO) named Qadeer-Ul-Uloom, in Sambhal

History
Qadeer-ul-Uloom is a registered NGO in Mandi Kishan Das Sarai, Sambhal. Founded in 1992 by social activist Haji Abdul Qadeer (Late), the NGO was registered with Registrar of Societies in 1996. Other institutions run by Qadeer-ul-Ulomm includes Al-Qadeer Public School, Al-Qadeer Junior High School and Madarsa Ahle-Sunnat Qadeer-ul-Uloom Husainiya Ashrafiya

Minority institution
Al-Qadeer Higher Secondary School is a Minority Educational Institution as declared by the National Commission for Minority Educational Institutions, Government of India and is granted under Section 2(g) of National Commission for Minority Educational Institutions Act-2004.

See also
Education in Sambhal
Maulana Azad Education Foundation
Government Degree College Sambhal

References

Links to this page
Sambhal

External links

 

High schools and secondary schools in Uttar Pradesh
Education in Sambhal